Calculus on manifolds may refer to:
Calculus on Manifolds, an undergraduate real analysis and differential geometry textbook by Michael Spivak
The generalization of differential and Integral calculus to differentiable manifolds. For this, see Calculus on Euclidean space#Calculus on manifolds.

See also
Differential geometry